John Raphael may refer to:

John Raphael (catepan), the Catepan of Italy from 1046 to 1049
John Raphael (sportsman) (18821917), Belgian-born English cricketer and rugby union footballer
John Raphael Smith (17521812), English painter and mezzotint engraver